Surcheh-ye Bala (also Romanized as Sūrcheh-ye Bālā) is a village in Karkevand Rural District, in the Central District of Mobarakeh County, Isfahan Province, Iran. At the 2006 census, its population was 289, in 69 families.

References 

Populated places in Mobarakeh County